John Kid was an outlawed minister of the Covenant. He was seized by Claverhouse among the insurgents after the affair at Drumclog. He was released by the insurgents but recaptured in a bog a few miles from Bothwell Bridge with a sword in his belt. Kid was taken to Edinburgh along with another preacher named John King. They were each subjected to torture, by the boots, condemned to death, and executed. Following his death Kid's head and limbs were displayed at the Netherbow Port on Edinburgh's Royal Mile  beside James Guthrie's skull.

Life
John Kid, an outlawed minister of the covenant. He was taken prisoner with John King after the battle of Bothwell Bridge which took place on 22 June 1679. 
Kid was brought before the council on 9 July 1679, along with John King. They pleaded that though found amongst the insurgents, they had taken no share in their proceedings, that they were in fact detained among them by force, that they had refused to preach to them, and, had seized the first opportunity of escaping before the battle. Howie said: "Whether he had ever been ordained, or was only a probationer, we have not discovered. If he was, it must have been shortly previous to the engagement at which he was taken, and his presence at which was deemed sufficient to infer the highest penalty. He was strictly examined as to the origin of the rising, and his answers not being satisfactory, he was questioned by torture with the boot. The torture revealled nothing. He was thereafter indicted, along with Mr. King, for having been in the rebellion, and for having preached at field conventicles."

At their trial, on 28 July, they had claimed that they were conventicle preachers, but so far from being disloyal rebels, they advised the armed brethren to return 'to loyalty and Christianitie.' Kid further pleaded that Monmouth had given him quarter, and that he carried a short sword merely to disguise himself from being known as a preacher.

Hanging and mutilation

Proclamation was made immediately before the execution of an indulgence to the ‘outed’ ministers, and Kid and King were pressed by Robert Fleming the elder, then a fellow-prisoner, to signify their approval of it, which they resolutely declined to do. King and Kid were executed at the cross of Edinburgh on 14 August 1679. Following this, their heads and limbs being severed from their bodies and placed on the Nether Bow port.

Works
Kid's last speech on the scaffold was printed.

References
Citations

Other sources

Attribution

1679 deaths
17th-century Scottish people
17th-century Protestant religious leaders
Covenanters
Protestant martyrs of Scotland
Persecution of the Covenanters